Elise Gislaine Pendall is an American soil and ecosystem ecologist who is a professor at Western Sydney University. She studies how biogeochemical cycling responds to climate change and disturbances to the ecosystem.

Early life and education 
Pendall was an undergraduate student at Cornell University and a master's student at the University of California, Berkeley. She completed her doctoral research at the University of Arizona. Her research considered pinyon pine cellulose in the United States. After graduating, she moved to the University of Colorado Boulder as a research assistant.

Research and career 
At the University of Wyoming, Pendall studied carbon and water fluxes between ecosystems and the atmosphere. She looked at how elevated levels of carbon dioxide impacted these water fluxes.

In 2014 Pendall moved to Western Sydney University, where she joined the Hawkesbury Institute for the Environment and established a master's program on Ecosystems in the Changing World. She investigates Eddy covariance, a technique that allows measurement of turbulent fluxes that occur within atmospheric boundary layers, and stable isotope analysis. As she is located in Sydney, Pendall has investigated local flora, including the native eucalyptus. Her research considers carbon regulation above and below ground, and how carbon is stored in soil.

Selected publications

References 

Academic staff of Western Sydney University
Cornell University alumni
University of California, Berkeley alumni
University of Arizona alumni
Living people
Year of birth missing (living people)